Keep Flexin is a mixtape by American rapper Rich the Kid. It was released on October 31, 2016. The mixtape features guest appearances from rappers Desiigner, Migos, Young Thug, Famous Dex, Playboi Carti and  Jeremih. The mixtape features production by Rich The Kid himself, DJ Durel, Lab Cook, Maaly Raw, Danny Wolf, Retro Sushi and Honorable C.N.O.T.E.

Track listing

References

2016 mixtape albums
Rich the Kid albums
Albums produced by Honorable C.N.O.T.E.